Nicolai Højgaard (born 12 March 2001) is a Danish professional golfer. He had a successful amateur career, winning the 2018 European Amateur and being part of the Danish team that won the Eisenhower Trophy later in the year.

Amateur career

Højgaard was part of the Danish team that won the 2017 European Boys Team Championship, beating the hosts Spain in the final.

Højgaard had a successful 2018. In April he won a professional tournament, the Bravo Tours Open on the Nordic Golf League. In June he was second in the individual competition for the boys Toyota Junior World Cup, four strokes behind his brother Rasmus. Denmark also won the team competition. Two weeks later he won the European Amateur, a win that gained him an entry to the 2018 Open Championship. In September he was part of the Danish team that won the 2018 Eisenhower Trophy for the first time. He played for Europe in the Junior Ryder Cup later in September and in October he represented Denmark in the Youth Olympic Games.

Professional career
Højgaard turned professional at the start of 2019. He played a mixture of Nordic Golf League and Challenge Tour events for most of the season. In September he was runner-up in the KLM Open, a European Tour event, one stroke behind Sergio García.

In September 2021, Højgaard won his first European Tour event at the DS Automobiles Italian Open winning by one shot ahead of Tommy Fleetwood and Adrian Meronk. His twin brother Rasmus had won the week before at the Omega European Masters, meaning that the Højgaard twins became the first brothers to win in back-to-back weeks on the European Tour.

Højgaard picked up his second European Tour victory in February 2022 at the Ras Al Khaimah Championship. He shot 24 under par for four rounds; beating Jordan Smith by four shots.

Personal life
Højgaard's twin brother Rasmus is a professional golfer and was also part of the Danish team that won the 2018 Eisenhower Trophy.

Amateur wins
2016 Hovborg Kro Open
2017 DGU Elite Tour I Herrer
2018 Hovborg Kro Open, European Amateur

Source:

Professional wins (3)

European Tour wins (2)

Nordic Golf League wins (1)

Results in major championships
Results not in chronological order before 2019 and in 2020.

CUT = missed the half-way cut
"T" = Tied
NT = No tournament due to COVID-19 pandemic

Team appearances
Amateur
European Boys' Team Championship (representing Denmark): 2017 (winners)
European Amateur Team Championship (representing Denmark): 2018
Junior Ryder Cup (representing Europe): 2018
Eisenhower Trophy (representing Denmark): 2018 (winner)

Professional
Hero Cup (representing Continental Europe): 2023 (winners)

References

External links

Danish male golfers
European Tour golfers
Golfers at the 2018 Summer Youth Olympics
Danish twins
Twin sportspeople
Sportspeople from the Region of Southern Denmark
People from Billund Municipality
2001 births
Living people